The Bailong River is a 576km-long river in the Yangtze River basin.  From its source to confluence with the Jialing River, the Bailong is actually longer and is thus the main stem of the Jialing River system. The scenic Jiuzhaigou reserve is found along one of the Bailong's tributaries. Two reservoirs have been constructed in Wen County (Bikou Dam). The reservoirs serve to provide hydroelectricity, aquaculture, flood control, irrigation and for tourism development.

History

In August 2010, heavy rains triggered a mudslide that dammed the river in Zhugqu County, Gansu, causing extensive damage and killing over a thousand people.

Course
The Bailong River, in name, rises in Gansu's Luqu County, just west of the town of Langmusi.  The river drains the northern sections of the Min Mountains and then flows through Zhugqu and Longnan before meeting the Jialing River in Guangyuan, Sichuan. The main stem of the river, however, is actually a tributary that has its source in the Min Mountains, north of Songpan.

Notes

See also
List of rivers in China

Rivers of Gansu
Tributaries of the Yangtze River